GJB 5860-2006 is a Chinese military technical standard describing a vertical launching system (VLS) for all types of missiles aboard surface combatants.

Each cell carries one missile; the shortest cell may carry four missiles. Hot and cold launches are supported; hot launching uses the concentric canister launch (CCL) approach with exhaust vents within each launch cell.

The first operational implementation is believed to be the VLS aboard the People's Liberation Army Navy's Type 052D destroyer.

Armament what VLS can use:

YJ-18 anti-ship missile
YJ-21 anti-ship missile
HHQ-9 SAM
CJ-10 land-attack cruise missiles
Missile-launched anti-submarine torpedoes

See also
 Mark 41 Vertical Launching System; variable cell length, hot launch only
 Mark 57 Vertical Launching System; single cell length, cold launch, and hot launch via CCL

References

Ship-based missile launchers
Military equipment introduced in the 2010s